Mykel Shannon Jenkins (born July 3, 1969) is an American actor, perhaps best known as the winner of the first season of the SOAPnet reality television series I Wanna Be a Soap Star.

Career
His prize for winning the contest was a 13-week-contract on General Hospital as Officer Byron Murphy, though he was dropped to recurring after the contract was over. Jenkins exited the soap when his character was shot and killed. His final appearance was on July 22, 2005.

He began appearing on The Bold and the Beautiful on November 21, 2007, again playing the police officer, Charlie Baker.

In 2010, he co-starred with Scott Adkins in the direct-to-video martial arts film Undisputed III: Redemption.

Personal life
Jenkins graduated from Loyola University in New Orleans, Louisiana.

Filmography
Double Jeopardy (1999) as Doorman
Baller Blockin' (2000) as Garr
Employee Dang (2003) as Mike
I Wanna Be a Soap Star (2004) as himself
General Hospital (2004–05) as Officer Byron Murphy
Stuck In The Suburbs (2004) as V.J.
Mr. 3000 (2004) as Reporter
Gang Warz (2004) as Dex
"Dad's Positive"(2006) as Brother
Behind Enemy Lines: Axis of Evil (2006) as Meideros
Family Curse (2006) as Arthur
Lucky You (2007) as Gary
The Bold and the Beautiful (2007-2012) as Detective Charlie Baker
The Great Observer (2008) (post-production) as Frankie Duson
Undisputed III: Redemption (2010) as Jericho 'Turbo' Jones
Kick Ass 2 (2013) as James
The Masked Saint (2016) as Detective Harper
The Last Heist (2016) as Unknown
Teleios (2017) as Dr. Orson
Same Kind of Different as Me (2017) as B.B.
The Paper Tigers (2020) as Jim

Guest appearances
I'm with Her (2003) Attendant
I Wanna Be a Soap Star (2004) Himself
Dr. Vegas (2004) Darell 'Sandman' Bay
Medical Investigation (2004) David Thorn
General Hospital (2004–2005) Officer Byron Murphy
Soap Talk (2005) Himself
Charmed (Episode: "Still Charmed & Kicking" and "Malice in Wonderland") (2005) Paul Haas
In Justice (2006) Billy Daniels
CSI: Miami (2006) Chris Ryder
Ugly Betty (Episodes: "Petra-Gate" and "A Tree Grows in Guadalajara") (2007) Tavares
McDonald's Commercial (2012) New Spicy Chicken McBites, Pool Game

External links

1969 births
Living people
20th-century American male actors
21st-century American male actors
African-American male actors
American male film actors
Reality casting show winners
American male soap opera actors
20th-century African-American people
21st-century African-American people